The Exquisite Death of Saxon Shore is the third full-length studio album by American post-rock band Saxon Shore. It was produced by Dave Fridmann (notable for his work with Mercury Rev and The Flaming Lips, in addition to bands as stylistically varying as Weezer and Mogwai)  and released on October 18, 2005, on Burnt Toast Vinyl.

Track listing

Personnel 
 Matthew Doty - guitars, keyboards; vocals (track 10)
 Matthew Stone - guitars, keyboards; vocals (track 10)
 Oliver Chapoy - guitars, keyboards; vocals (track 10)
 William Stichter - bass; vocals (track 10)
 Stephen Roessner - drums, percussion; vocals (track 10)

Steven Googin - vocals (track 10)

Song notes
"Marked with the Knowledge" was featured in Sony HD television commercials starting late April 2008.
Their song "This Shameless Moment" was used at the end of episode 3 of Joe Calzaghe vs. Roy Jones, Jr. 24/7 program on HBO. The song is played while you see Roy Jones talking about being a true champion and shadowboxing on a New York rooftop and you see Joe running on the Brooklyn Bridge and talking about how it is his time and that Roy Jones was yesterday and he is today.

References

2005 albums
Saxon Shore (band) albums
Albums recorded at Tarbox Road Studios
Albums produced by Dave Fridmann